Sándor Bródy (15 August 1884 – 19 April 1944) was a Jewish-Hungarian football (soccer) player. He competed for Hungary at the 1912 Olympics and was a star in the national side. His first appearance in Ferencvaros was in 1902 and he played in the starting lineup until 1914.

He took part in the First World War in the Austro-Hungarian army, and in March 1915 he was captured by the Russian Army in the Polish city of Przemysl and spent the rest of the war in the Russian prison camp at Berezovka on the river Ob in Siberia.

He played in 17 matches for the Hungarian national side and scored once (1906–1913). Later he worked as a coach for Swedish side IFK Goteborg (1921–1923) and for his former club, Ferencvaros (1937). During the Second World War, he was arrested along with other Jews during the Nazi occupation of Hungary and subsequently murdered.

References

External links
Profile of Sándor Bródy on JewsInSports.org
site FIFA - date of birth 15 August 1884

1884 births
People from Senica District
Sportspeople from the Trnava Region
People from the Kingdom of Hungary
Jewish Hungarian sportspeople
Jewish footballers
Hungarian footballers
Hungary international footballers
Ferencvárosi TC footballers
Olympic footballers of Hungary
Footballers at the 1912 Summer Olympics
Hungarian football managers
Hungarian expatriate football managers
IFK Göteborg managers
Hungarian expatriate sportspeople in Sweden
Ferencvárosi TC managers
Expatriate football managers in Sweden
1944 deaths
Association football midfielders
Hungarian Jews who died in the Holocaust
Hungarian civilians killed in World War II
Austro-Hungarian military personnel of World War I
Austro-Hungarian prisoners of war in World War I
World War I prisoners of war held by Russia